Baron Chen (born May 9, 1978) is a Taiwanese actor and model.

Early life
Chen is the eldest son of Chen Chi-li, Not long after he was born, his parents separated so he stayed with his grandparents. He studied tourism at the Chinese Culture University in Taipei.

Career
Chen made his first major appearance in the movie Kung Fu Dunk, but became better known with his role as Dylan in Taiwanese drama, Fated to Love You. He also appeared in two of Jay Chou's music videos for the songs "Blue and White Porcelain" from the album On the Run and "Ocean of Flowers" from Capricorn.

He later gained more fame through his roles in the television series My Daughter and The Magic Blade, which won him Most Popular Actor at the LeTV Awards.

Filmography

Television drama

Films

Variety

Music videos

References

External links
River Chen's Blog
 
Official Agency Profile
River Chen Facebook

Taiwanese male film actors
Living people
1978 births
Taiwanese male television actors
Male actors from Taipei
Participants in Chinese reality television series